Twenty Five Years of Dr. Feelgood is a double compilation album by Dr. Feelgood, and was released in February 1997.

The compilation was edited down from the previously released five CD, Looking Back, box set. Forty tracks from the band were included, incorporating material from vocalist Lee Brilleaux's final concert before his death, and four later efforts with their next singer, Pete Gage. The opening tracks had original guitarist Wilko Johnson in the line-up.

Track listing

Disc one
"She Does It Right" (Johnson) (3:22) - from Down by the Jetty
"I Don't Mind" (Johnson) (2:35) - from Down by the Jetty
"All Through the City" (Johnson) (3:01) - from Down by the Jetty
"Keep It Out of Sight" (Johnson) (3:00) - from the b-side of the single "Roxette"
"Roxette" (Johnson) - from Stupidity
"I Can Tell"  (McDaniel, Smith) (2:43) - from Malpractice
"Sneakin' Suspicion" (Johnson) (3:50) - from Sneakin' Suspicion
"Back in the Night" (Johnson) (3:08) - from Stupidity
"Going Back Home" (Green, Johnson) (3:40) - from Stupidity
"Riot in Cell Block No. 9" (Leiber, Stoller) (3:49) - from Stupidity
"She's a Windup" (Brilleaux, Martin, Mayo, Sparks) (1:59) - from Be Seeing You
"That's It, I Quit" (Lowe) (2:35) - from Be Seeing You
"Night Time" (Feldman, Goldstein, Gottehrer) (5:26) - from Private Practice
"Milk and Alcohol" (Lowe, Mayo) (2:55) - from Private Practice
"Put Him Out of Your Mind" (Mayo, Vernon) (3:49) - from Let It Roll
"Shotgun Blues" (Brilleaux, Sparks, Martin, Mayo) (5:51) - from On The Job
"No Mo Do Yakamo" (Krekel) (2:14) - from A Case of The Shakes
"Jumping From Love to Love" (Brilleaux, Fasterley, Sparks, Mayo) (2:51) - from A Case of The Shakes
"Violent Love" (Rush) (2:21) - from A Case of The Shakes
"Rat Race" (Brilleaux, Guitar) (2:43) - from Fast Women and Slow Horses
"Crazy 'Bout Girls" (Guitar) (3:05) - from Fast Women and Slow Horses

Disc two
"Dangerous" (Brilleaux, Mitchell, Morris, Russell, Wallis) (4:08) - from Doctors Orders
"Mad Man Blues" (Hooker) (2:24) - from Mad Man Blues
"Dimples" (Hooker) (2:58) - from Mad Man Blues
"Hunting Shooting Fishing" (Birch, Russell) (3:16) - from Classic
"See You Later Alligator" (Guidry) (4:00) - from Classic
"King For a Day" (Brilleaux, Sparks, Martin, Mayo, Wallis) (2:10) - from Live in London
"Baby Jane" (Bishop, Nesbitt, Reed, Simmons, Wilson) (2:44) - from Live in London
"Sugar Turns to Alcohol" (Birch, Douglas, Dr. Feelgood) (4:43) - from Primo
"Down by the Jetty Blues" (Birch, Dr. Feelgood) (5:51) - from Primo
"Double Crossed" (Walwyn) (3:32) - from The Feelgood Factor
"Wolfman Callin'" (Bronze, Morris) (5:51) - from The Feelgood Factor
"One Step Forward" (Bronze) (4:45) - from The Feelgood Factor
"Roadrunner" (Dozier, Holland) (3:48) - from Down at the Doctors
"Down at the Doctors" (Jupp) (3:50) - from Down at the Doctors
"Heart of the City" (Lowe) (3:35) - from Down at the Doctors
"World Keeps Turning" (Green) (3:47) - from On the Road Again
"Instinct To Survive" (Walwyn) (3:21) - from On the Road Again
"Going Out West" (Waits) (3:21) - from On The Road Again
"You Got Me" (Brim) (4:46) - from On the Road Again

Credits
Stef Suchomski - cover artwork
Christopher Somerville - sleeve notes
Kevin Morris - compilation
Jeremy Cooper - remastering at The Master Room, London

References

Twenty Five Years of Dr. Feelgood - album sleeve notes

1997 compilation albums
Dr. Feelgood (band) albums